Maria Alicia Delgado (born March 17, 1947, Monterrey, Nuevo Leon) is a Mexican actress and comedian, best known as one of the two female regulars on Anabel. Delgado has spent her entire television career with Televisa.

For years Delgado performed in Monterrey] and Oaxaca. It was not until the early 1980s, however that a staffer with Televisa's Oaxaca affiliate discovered her. Delgado was brought to the attention of producer Enrique Segoviano, who in 1982 cast her in an episode of Odisea Burbujas.  This resulted in Delgado's relocation to Mexico City and she would go on to work with Segoviano frequently. She was cast as Marilu in the children's television series El tesoro del saber in 1984, not knowing that her must successful collaboration with Segoviano would come by decade's end.

Delgado, along with Anabel Ferreira, would be the only cast members to stay with Anabel for its entire run. When the series premiered, Mario Bezares and Eugenio Derbez were the male cast members. By 1993 the two women were still there, but Derbez's roles were now filled by Carlos Ignacio and Luis Arcoraz IV had replaced Bezares. Delgado's two best-known characters from this series were Yadhira Davilillo, a middle-aged mother in the Coralia sketches, and as an elderly woman in several others. So identifiable was the latter role that Delgado has reprised it several times since.

Delgado's elderly woman character has also appeared on, among other series, Derbez en cuando and XHDRBZ under the name of Alz (in the "Alz y Heimer" sketches) and Cero en Conducta as Jorge's (Jorge Ortiz de Pinedo) grandmother. Originally Jorge's grandmother, in recurring appearances, would try to defend Jorge and his classmates from their teacher and principal; in later recurring appearances, she would retell stories, which were acted out by the series' regular cast. Delgado also guested on Festival del Humor and Humor es...los comediantes in her elderly woman characterization. Her appearance on the latter, telecast in 2000, was ironic, as series regular Aida Pierce also would occasionally play an elderly woman in sketches.

Although Delgado is primarily a comedian, she has also appeared in telenovelas, including Querida enemiga and, most recently Amorcito Corazón.

References

External links

1947 births
Living people
Mexican women comedians
Actresses from Monterrey
Mexican telenovela actresses